Steven Ferguson (born 18 May 1977) is a Scottish football player, coach and executive.

He was appointed assistant manager of Ross County in June 2014, having previously been a coach at the club. When manager Derek Adams was sacked in August 2014, Ferguson was placed in temporary control of the club. He then became academy director, and was again placed in temporary charge of the first team in September 2017. Ferguson was appointed co-manager of Ross County in March 2018, working with Stuart Kettlewell. This arrangement continued until June 2020, when Kettlewell was given sole control of the team and Ferguson became the club's chief executive.

Managerial statistics

Honours

Player
Dunfermline Athletic 
Scottish First Division: 1995–96

Ross County 
Scottish Third Division: 1998–99

Brechin City 
Scottish Second Division: 2004–05

Manager
Ross County

Scottish Championship : 2018-19
Scottish Challenge Cup: 2018–19

Individual
Ross County

Scottish Championship Manager of the season : 2018–19
 Scottish Championship Manager of the Month (3): September 2018, October 2018, April 2019

References

External links

1977 births
Living people
Scottish footballers
Dunfermline Athletic F.C. players
Ross County F.C. players
Ayr United F.C. players
Brechin City F.C. players
Dumbarton F.C. players
Stenhousemuir F.C. players
Scottish Football League players
Footballers from Edinburgh
Association football midfielders
Scottish football managers
Ross County F.C. managers
Scottish Professional Football League managers